Khormakahn may refer to:
 Khormakahn Shahrakhi